David Bradford (born 22 February 1953) is a retired professional football midfielder from England.

In 1968, Bradford began his career as a fifteen-year-old apprentice with Blackburn Rovers. In 1971, he moved up to the first team. In 1974, they sent him to Sheffield United for £10,000 where he played for Ken Furphy. In 1978, Furphy, now coach of the Detroit Express of the North American Soccer League, brought Bradford to the United States. In 1981, he signed with the Washington Diplomats. He returned to England at the end of the NASL 1981 season and played for Coventry City in 1981–1982 before returning in the 1982 season with the Tulsa Roughnecks. Bradford played for the Baltimore Blast in the Major Indoor Soccer League in 1982–1983. In 1983, he played for the Seattle Sounders. The team folded at the end of the season and Bradford returned to the Roughnecks for the last season of the NASL.

After his retirement, he managed the Brownhill post office for over a decade. He now coaches in the Tulsa Soccer Academy.

References

External links

NASL stats

1953 births
Living people
Association football midfielders
Baltimore Blast (1980–1992) players
Blackburn Rovers F.C. players
Coventry City F.C. players
Detroit Express players
English footballers
English expatriate footballers
Major Indoor Soccer League (1978–1992) players
North American Soccer League (1968–1984) indoor players
North American Soccer League (1968–1984) players
Peterborough United F.C. players
Seattle Sounders (1974–1983) players
Sheffield United F.C. players
Tulsa Roughnecks (1978–1984) players
Washington Diplomats (NASL) players
English expatriate sportspeople in the United States
Expatriate soccer players in the United States